The Cannelton Locks and Dam is a tainter-gated dam with two locks on the Ohio River, on the border between the U.S. states of Indiana and Kentucky. Construction of the locks began in July 1963. The locks began operation in December 1966 and were completed April 1967. Construction on the dam started in August 1965 and the dam was completed in 1974. The structure was designed, built, and is operated by the United States Army Corps of Engineers Louisville District.

Dam
The Cannelton Dam is located at river mile 720.7 (measured from Pittsburgh, Pennsylvania) and has two sections. The gates are held between  piers. Electric hoists on top of the piers are used to raise or lower the gates. At the end of the gated section of the dam there is second section, a concrete fixed weir on the Kentucky side of the river.

Locks
The Cannelton Locks run parallel to each other on the Indiana side of the river. The locks can be filled or emptied in around 8 minutes.

 of water is required to operate the lock.

The locks reduce travel time because it enables large commercial tows to go through only one lockage rather than the three locks it replaced. Also the large lock chamber allows a large vessels to pass through the lock in a single operation instead of using smaller lock sections.

Authorization and construction

On January 27, 1960, the project was approved by Secretary of the Army, Wilber Marion Brucker. Under the authority of Section 6 of the Rivers and Harbors Act, approved March 3, 1909, the existing Locks 43, 44 and 45 were replaced. The construction of the locks began in July 1963.  The locks began operation in December 1966 and were completed April 1967. Construction on the dam started in August 1965 and the dam was completed in 1974.  The structure was designed, built, and is operated by the United States Army Corps of Engineers Louisville District.

In 1995, the property was excessed to the United States Fish and Wildlife Service for use as a wildlife habitat.

Hydroelectric power

American Municipal Power (AMP) is currently outfitting the dam to divert water to three bulb turbines to generate an average gross annual output of approximately 458 million kilowatt-hours (kWh). The project includes the construction of an intake approach channel, a concrete powerhouse, and a tailrace channel. Construction began in 2009. Excavation and cofferdam construction was completed in 2010. Powerhouse construction began in 2011. All concrete work on the powerhouse has been completed and work has begun on the interior. The project that will cost an estimated $416 million. The plant reached full commercial operation in June 2016.

See also
List of locks and dams of the Ohio River

References

External links
US Army Corps of Engineers: Cannelton Locks and Dam
Advanced Hydrologic Prediction Service: Ohio River at Cannelton Lock National Weather Service

Dams in Indiana
Dams in Kentucky
Buildings and structures in Hancock County, Kentucky
Dams on the Ohio River
Transportation buildings and structures in Perry County, Indiana
Buildings and structures in Perry County, Indiana
United States Army Corps of Engineers dams
Locks of Indiana
Locks of Kentucky
Hydroelectric power plants in Ohio
Hydroelectric power plants in Indiana